Afroditi Grigoriadou (29 December 1931 – 2 July 2020) was a Greek actress of film, theatre and television.

Personal life
She was the mother of actress Koralia Karanti.

Selected filmography

Awards

References

External links
 

1937 births
2020 deaths
People from Sevastopol
20th-century Greek actresses
Greek television actresses
Greek film actresses
Greek stage actresses